Andriamena is a rural municipality in Madagascar. It belongs to the district of Tsaratanana, which is a part of Betsiboka Region. The population of the municipality was 2,698 inhabitants in 2018.

Primary and junior level secondary education are available in town. The majority 54% of the population of the commune are farmers, while an additional 44% receives their livelihood from raising livestock. The most important crop is rice, while other important products are peanuts and cassava.  Services provide employment for 2% of the population.

References 

Populated places in Betsiboka